Dennis Bryce (born 31 December 1977) is a Western Samoan football player who plays in the central defence position. He made his debut on 10 May 2004 against American Samoa in their group match in the 2004 OFC Nations Cup/qualification tournament for the 2006 FIFA World Cup. Samoa defeated American Samoa, 4-0. The first goal of the match was made by Bryce, a heading in from a corner.

References

Living people
Samoan footballers
Sportspeople from Apia
Samoa international footballers
Association football defenders
1977 births